Tong but lut is a Cantonese dessert. Glutinous rice flour balls in sugar syrup are sprinkled with crushed roasted peanuts (and/or roasted sesame seeds and desiccated coconut). The stickiness of the balls prevents the topping from coming off, hence the name.

The dish played a role in traditional Cantonese betrothals. A man seeking a wife would visit her parents and if the woman's family agreed to his suit, he would be served tong but lut, to suggest  that the couple's married life would be sweet and they would stick together. If his request was refused, he would be served a sweet soup containing scrambled eggs and dried tofu skin to suggest that the couple would fall apart (散 meaning both 'scramble' and 'break up'). This form of politeness helped the suitor maintain face.

See also
Sì (dessert)
Tangyuan (food)

References

Cantonese cuisine
Glutinous rice dishes
Chinese rice dishes
Chinese desserts
Hong Kong cuisine
Rice cakes